is a Quasi-National Park around the battlefields of south Okinawa, Japan. It was established as a Prefectural Park in 1965 and redesignated with the return of Okinawa to Japanese administration in 1972.

See also
 List of national parks of Japan
 Okinawa Kaigan Quasi-National Park
 Battle of Okinawa
 Cornerstone of Peace

References

External links

 Introduction and map 
 Detailed map of the Park 

National parks of Japan
Parks and gardens in Okinawa Prefecture
Protected areas established in 1972
Itoman, Okinawa